Roger Geoffrey Clarke (8 July 1952 – 28 January 2007), was an English ornithologist and world authority on harriers and other birds of prey.

Early life
Roger Geoffrey Clarke was born on 8 July 1952 in Bedford, England.  He was educated at Bedford Modern School and later qualified as a Chartered Accountant which he practiced for the rest of his life while still pursuing his main interest as an ornithologist.

Clarke was said to have been 'vaguely interested in birds from his youth' but he was keener on playing lead guitar in a rock band until hearing damage ended his musical career. It was in fact a love of angling that steered him towards ornithology.  In 1981 he moved to Reach to fish pike and bream and would watch hen harriers hunting over the landscape.

Ornithological work

Two years later he teamed up with the artist Donald Watson to develop the UK Hen Harrier Winter Roost Survey. The thesis for Clarke's PhD in biological sciences, awarded by the University of Liverpool in 1999, was on bird of prey feeding ecology.

Working for the University of Aberdeen, Clarke focused on Orkney hen harrier feeding. He also contributed to the controversial Joint Raptor Study Langholm Project, studying the predation of red grouse by hen harriers and peregrine falcons in southwest Scotland's border country.

Clarke's reputation took him to India to study the world's largest harrier roosts for the Bombay Natural History Society. He subsequently worked on a project that successfully reintroduced red kites to several English regions.

Clarke's first book, Harriers of the British Isles, appeared in 1990. It was followed by The Marsh Harrier (1995) and Montagu's Harrier (1996).  He was co-editor of Biology and Conservation of Small Falcons in 1993 and during the final months before his early death he worked on the second edition of The Hen Harrier, adding to the first edition written by Watson.

Clarke was treasurer of the British Ornithologists' Union (2000–06).  He also looked after the accounts of the Society of Wildlife Artists (SWLA), whose then president, Bruce Pearson, was among his friends. His collection of more than 200 works of wildlife art formed part of a SWLA exhibition staged at the Mall Galleries, London in 2007.

Personal life
The weekend before Clarke's death, Pearson took him five miles into the heart of the fens. Hen and marsh harriers floated into view over the marshes, a final encounter with two bird species that had inspired his ornithological career. Clarke was survived by his wife, Janis, and by a son and daughter.

References

1952 births
2007 deaths
English ornithologists
Alumni of the University of Liverpool
People educated at Bedford Modern School
People from Bedford
20th-century British zoologists